Ackroyd Point is a point situated just east of O'Hara Glacier along the south side of the inner portion of Yule Bay, on the north coast of Victoria Land. Mapped by United States Geological Survey (USGS) from surveys and U.S. Navy air photos, 1960–62. Named by Advisory Committee on Antarctic Names (US-ACAN) for Lieutenant Frederick W. Ackroyd, MC, U.S. Navy, medical officer with the winter party at the Naval Air Facility at McMurdo Sound, 1958. The headland is situated on the Pennell Coast, a portion of Antarctica lying between Cape Williams and Cape Adare.

Headlands of Victoria Land
Pennell Coast